Events in the year 2022 in East Timor.

Incumbents

Events 
Ongoing — COVID-19 pandemic in East Timor

 March 19 – 2022 East Timorese presidential election: Timorese are called to the polls to choose the country's president.
 March 20 – Preliminary results show that former president José Ramos-Horta is ahead of the incumbent Francisco Guterres in the presidential election.
 April 19 – The East Timorese people head to the polls for the second round of the presidential election between José Ramos-Horta and incumbent Francisco Guterres.
 April 20 – Former president José Ramos-Horta defeats incumbent president Francisco Guterres to become the next President of East Timor.

Deaths 

 3 January – Silvino Adolfo Morais, 65, politician.

References 

 

 
2020s in East Timor
Years of the 21st century in East Timor
East Timor
East Timor